Dagala may refer to:

 Bernardo O. Dagala, Filipino politician who served as the President of the Municipality of Malabon
 Dagala Gewog, village block of Thimphu District, Bhutan.
 Dagala del Re, frazioni of Santa Venerina, Italian municipality in the Province of Catania